Bommalattam was an 2012 Indian-Tamil-language soap opera that aired on Sun TV from 15 October 2012 to 22 October 2016 for 1150 episodes. The show starred Sirija, Shreekumar, Absar and Preethi.

It was produced by San Media Ltd and directed by Shiva.K and Stalin. The title track was composed by Dhina and sung by Haricharan with lyrics by Vairamuthu. The plot revolves around Bharathi who was in love with Kathir. But, fate makes Bharathi marry Santhosh, a rich playboy and Kathir marry Santhosh's sister, Devi. Santhosh and Devi are the spoilt children of Chidambaram Periyasamy, a rich business tycoon.

Cast

Main cast

 Sirija as Bharathi Santhosh 
 Absar as Kathir alias Madhan
 Shreekumar as Santhosh Chidambaram 
 Preethi as Devi Kathir

Supporting cast

 Delhi Kumar as Chidambaram Periyasamy
 Vijay Krishnaraj as Dhandapani
 Kathadi Ramamurthy as Badrinarayanan
 Gowri Lakshmi as Malathi Rajesh
 Magima as Shivagami Natraj
 Sukumaran Sairam as Natraj Periyasamy
 Barath as Rajesh Natraj
 Apsara as Malliga 
 Surendhar Raaj as Ram aka Seetharaman
 Dhesikha as Malar aka Malarvizhi Seetharaman
 Vithiya as Mahathi
 Shila as Kokila Dhandapani
 Sasi as Saravanan
 Moorthy Arumugam
 Chandira Segaran
 T Rajeshwari as Rajeshwari
 Vincent Roy
 Jayaprakash as Malaichaamy
 OAK Sundar as Murugesan
 Lenin Anpan
 Divya Krishnan as Sophie

Former cast
 Ganeshkar as Bhoopathi
 Bhavana as Srilatha/ Durga
 Nisha as Tara

Original soundtrack

Title song
It was written by Vairamuthu, composed by the Dhina. It was sung by Haricharan.

Soundtrack

Production
The series was directed by Shiva.K and Stalin. It was produced by San Media Ltd, along with the production crew of 2004-2016 Sun TV Serials Ahalya (2004-2006), Bandham (2006-2009) and Uravugal (2008-2012)

Awards and nominations

International broadcast
The Series was released on 15 October 2012 on Sun TV, the series also aired on Sun TV HD. The Show was also broadcast internationally on Channel's international distribution. It aired in Sri Lanka, South East Asia, Middle East, United States, Canada, Europe, Oceania, South Africa and Sub Saharan Africa on Sun TV. The show's episodes were released on YouTube channel as San Media Ltd.

  It aired in the Indian state of Andhra Pradesh on Gemini TV Dubbed in Telugu language as Bommalata. The show premiered on 23 June 2014 and last aired on 8 July 2014 and ended with 12 episodes.
  It aired in the Indian state of Kerala on Surya TV Dubbed in Malayalam language as Paava Koothu.

See also
 List of programs broadcast by Sun TV

References

External links
 Official Website 

Sun TV original programming
Tamil-language romance television series
2010s Tamil-language television series
2012 Tamil-language television series debuts
Tamil-language television shows
2016 Tamil-language television series endings